Uriel Birnbaum (November 13, 1894, in Vienna − December 9, 1956, in Amersfoort, Netherlands) was an Austrian painter, caricaturist, writer and poet.

Birnbaum was the youngest son of Nathan Birnbaum, a Jewish philosopher, and Rosa Korngut. Reportedly, his art education consisted of  only one month at a Berlin art school in 1913. He was severely injured during World War I. He illustrated a number of books, including works of Edgar Allan Poe, Lewis Carroll's Through the Looking-Glass (Alice im Spiegelglass,  Vienna, 1923), and his own Weltuntergang (1921).

References 

20th-century Austrian painters
20th-century Austrian male artists
Austrian male painters
Austrian caricaturists
Austrian illustrators
Austrian children's book illustrators
20th-century Austrian poets
Austrian male poets
Writers from Vienna
Austrian Jews
Dutch Jews
Austrian emigrants to the Netherlands
Jewish painters
1894 births
1956 deaths
20th-century Austrian male writers